Joly Talukder is the current general secretary of the Bangladesh Garment Workers Trade Union Centre (GWTUC).

Career
From July 28, 2014, Talukder took part in a hunger strike of 1,600 Tuba Group garment workers in Badda Thana, who had occupied their factory in protest against the repeated non-payment of wages by the factory owner. When police dispersed the protest on August 7 using tear gas and rubber bullets, they detained Talukder together with Mushrefa Mishu, leader of the Garment Workers Unity Forum. Both were released on the same day.

Talukder was elected as GWTUC's general secretary in 2017. At the same conference, Montu Ghosh was elected as president. Talukder is the union's first female general secretary. 

In April 2018, Talukder and five other GWTUC leaders were arrested based on charges of the Bangladesh Garment Manufacturers and Exporters Association. The factory owner's association, following an attack on workers and trade union representatives, had alleged that the workers were attempting to murder its representatives.  Talukder was held in solitary confinement. The arrests provoked outrage in Bangladesh and abroad, with the Clean Clothes Campaign and German union ver.di calling for the prisoners' release. All the detained were released on April 5 on interim bail.

Later that year, Talukder stood as a candidate for the 2018 Bangladeshi general election in Netrokona-4 for the Communist Party of Bangladesh. On December 15, Talukder and several supporters were wounded by attackers supporting the Awami League candidate, Rebecca Momin.

References

Bangladeshi trade unionists
Bangladeshi women trade unionists
Year of birth missing (living people)
Living people